Abandon Ship may refer to:

Abandonment of ship
Abandon Ship!, a 1957 British drama film 
Abandon Ship (Lianne Hall album)
Abandon Ship (Knife Party album)
"Abandon Ship" (Gallows song)
"Abandon Ship", a song by Blaggers ITA
"Abandon Ship", a song by Less Than Jake from the album GNV FLA